The ducat was the main currency of the Kingdom of the Two Sicilies between 1816 and 1860. When the Congress of Vienna created the kingdom merging the Kingdom of Naples and the Kingdom of Sicily, the ducat became at par a continuation of the Neapolitan ducat and the Sicilian piastra issued prior to 1816, although the Sicilian piastra had been subdivided into 240 grana. In the mainland part of the kingdom, the ducat also replaced the Napoleonic lira.

The subdivision and the coinage of the currency were simplified with respect to the pre-Napoleonic era: only three denominations survived. The ducat proper was the name of the gold coins, and curiously it did not exist as a single unit; the grana (singular: grano) was the name of the silver coins, itself also not existing as a single unit; the tornesel (Italian: tornese) was the name of the copper coins, which were worth half a grana. Accounts were kept in ducats, each of 100 grana or 200 tornesels.

The piastra was the unofficial name of the biggest silver coin, which had a value of 120 grana. When the Italian lira replaced the coinage of the House of Bourbon in 1861, a rate of 1 piastra = 5.1 lire was established.

Coins

Gold coins were issued for 3, 6, 15 and 30 ducats.

References

Currencies of Italy
Kingdom of the Two Sicilies
Modern obsolete currencies
Sicilies
1860 disestablishments
19th-century economic history
1816 establishments in Italy